Burkina Faso competed at the 2000 Summer Paralympics. They were represented by one male athlete.

Team 
There were 0 female and 1 male athletes representing the country at the 2000 Summer Paralympics.  Their participation numbers for Sydney were down from both Barcelona and Atlanta, when they had sent 3 athletes.  The following games in Athens, the country would be absent entirely.

See also
2000 Summer Paralympics

References

Bibliography

External links
International Paralympic Committee

Nations at the 2000 Summer Paralympics
Paralympics
2000